Hafari Ahvaz Football Club is an Iranian football club based in Ahvaz, Iran. They are part of the Melli Haffari Company Ahvaz Sports Club, and they currently compete in the Azadegan League.

History
In the 2010–11 3rd Division season, Hafari finished first in group two and was promoted to the 2nd Division. The following year they finished second in group one of the 2nd Division and were promoted to the Azadegan League. The following year they were relegated back to the 2nd Division.

Players
As of November 24, 2012

First-team squad

Season-by-season
The table below shows the achievements of the club in various competitions.

See also
 Sherkat Melli Haffari Futsal Club
 2011-12 Hazfi Cup
 2011–12 Iran Football's 2nd Division

References

Football clubs in Iran
Association football clubs established in 1998
1998 establishments in Iran